Reports in Common Pleas and Exchequer, from E.T. 28 G. III., 1788, to H.T. 36 G. III., 1796 is the title of a collection of nominate reports, by Henry Blackstone, the nephew of Sir William Blackstone, of cases decided between approximately 1788 and 1796. For the purpose of citation their name may be abbreviated to "Bl H". They are in two volumes. They are reprinted in volume 126 of the English Reports.

John Gage Marvin said:

See also
Anstruther's Reports

References
Reports in Common Pleas and Exchequer, from E.T. 28 G. III., 1788, to H.T. 36 G. III., 1796. 4th ed. with notes, &c. 2 vols. 8vo. London. 1827.

Sets of reports reprinted in the English Reports